San Miguel Mountain is a mountain located in Chula Vista, California. It is 2,567' high, and is the 84th highest peak in San Diego County.

Because San Miguel is "the highest point close in to the San Diego metro area," it has been home to radio and TV transmitters since the 1960s.

References

Mountains of San Diego County, California
Mountains of Southern California